The Ortolo is a coastal river in the southwest of the department of Corse-du-Sud, Corsica, France. 
It is dammed to store water for irrigation.

Course

It crosses the communes of Levie, Foce and Sartène.
Its source is in Levie on the southwest of the  Punta di a Vacca Morta.
It flows in a generally southwest direction past the hamlet of Bilzese (Foce) to the border of the commune of Sartène where it is dammed to form the Ortolo Reservoir.
Below the dam it continues to flow southeast to enter the sea to the southwest of Tizzano.

The D265 road leads east towards the river from the village of Bilzese.
The D365 branches off after  and crosses the river by a metal bridge.
From the bridge a footpath leads down to the river, where there are a few small natural swimming pools.
There is a larger and deeper pool just below the bridge.

Dam

The Ortolo reservoir is formed by a dam (Barrage de l'Ortolo) that impounds the Ortolo river. 
The dam is in the commune of Sartène, while the bulk of the reservoir is in the commune of Levie.
The dam is operated by the Office d’Equipement Hydraulique de Corse.
It is made of riprap.
The dam came into service in 1996 and provides water for irrigation.

Hydrology

Measurements of the river flow were taken at the Moulin de Curgia station in Sartène from 1976 to 1996.
The maximum daily flow was  recorded on 2 February 1996.

The river was measured higher up at the Vignalella station in Levie from 1996 to 2021.
The maximum daily flow was  recorded on 23 December 2007.

Tributaries

The following streams (ruisseaux) are tributaries of the Ortolo (ordered by length) and sub-tributaries:

Balatèse: 
Capitellu: 
Zeruleca: 
Pendone: 
Alia: 
Bartuleone: 
Vulpicini: 
Acqua Torta: 
Funtanella: 
Mezzati: 
Tempesta: 
Lataga: 
Petra Ponta: 
Filumozzu: 
Urtale: 
Cauria: 
Chiuva: 
Saparella: 
Mola: 
Giuncheto: 
Castellu: 
Cuticciu: 
Casacce: 
Caraglia: 
Canalsecco: 
Mela: 
Salcinaja: 
Caldaja: 
Lampinu: 
Petra Mattaja: 
Capu d'Omo: 
Vangone Niellu: 
Alzeta: 
Curbaju: 
Ribaldino:

Notes

Sources

Rivers of Corse-du-Sud
Rivers of France
Coastal basins of the Mediterranean Sea in Corsica